Murzynowo may refer to the following places:
Murzynowo, Lubusz Voivodeship (west Poland)
Murzynowo, Masovian Voivodeship (east-central Poland)
Murzynowo, Pomeranian Voivodeship (north Poland)